The 2017 China Tour was the first season of the China Tour in which it had separated from the PGA Tour China. The season consisted of 15 events, two of which were co-sanctioned by the Challenge Tour and one by the Asian Tour.

Schedule
The following table lists official events during the 2017 season.

Order of Merit
The Order of Merit was based on prize money won during the season, calculated in Renminbi.  The leading player on the tour (not otherwise exempt) earned status to play on the 2018 European Tour.

Notes

References

External links

2017 in golf
2017 in Chinese sport